Pennington railway station served Pennington, Leigh, Greater Manchester, England on the Bolton and Leigh Railway. It was situated within the historic county of Lancashire.

The station opened as Bradshaw Leach on the Kenyon and Leigh Junction Railway in 1831 and was renamed Pennington in 1877. It closed in 1954. The line serving Leigh closed in 1969.

History
Pennington Station was built when the Bolton and Leigh Railway, which reached the Leeds and Liverpool Canal in Leigh in 1830, was extended by the construction of the Kenyon and Leigh Junction Railway to meet the Liverpool and Manchester Railway at Kenyon in 1831.

In 1864 the station became a junction when the Tyldesley Loopline from Tyldesley and Leigh and Bedford, built by the London and North Western Railway, joined the Kenyon and Leigh line just to the north of Bradshaw Leach Station.

The station was renamed Pennington Station in 1877.

The London and North Western Railway built another line via Plank Lane to Platt Bridge and Wigan NW which opened in 1885 creating a three way junction.

Stations on the line became part of the London Midland and Scottish Railway in 1923, the London Midland Region of British Railways on nationalisation in 1948, and were closed by the British Transport Commission six years later in 1954 when the line to Bolton Great Moor Street Station closed. Passenger services on the Tyldesley Loopline did not stop at Pennington but all stations and the line closed following the Beeching Axe on 5 May 1969.

The line of  the trackbed of the Bolton and Leigh Railway was used as the route of the A579 Leigh bypass.

Structure
On opening the line was single track and the station buildings, a booking office and waiting room, were on the east side. The line between Pennington and Kenyon Junction was doubled for the opening of the LNWR line from Tyldesley in 1864 and a second platform was constructed with a timber waiting shelter on the new line to the west.

References

Citations

Bibliography

Further reading

External links

Disused railway stations in the Metropolitan Borough of Wigan
Former London and North Western Railway stations
Railway stations in Great Britain opened in 1831
Railway stations in Great Britain closed in 1954
History of the Metropolitan Borough of Wigan
Buildings and structures in Leigh, Greater Manchester